Justin Gene Gregorits (born November 5, 1976) is an American writer, editor, publisher, and convicted sex offender. He founded and published Sex & Guts Magazine, an independent arts and culture journal, that ran from 1997 to 2004. Subsequent works include Johnny Behind The Deuce, Sex & Guts Anthology, Sex & Guts 4, Midnight Mavericks, Dog Days: Volume One, Dog Days: Volume Two, Hatchet Job: The Gene Gregorits Reader, and Fishhook. Gregorits' most recent works have been described as having running themes of poverty, sexual deviance, trauma, mental illness, violence, multi-substance abuse and death. He has said that early influences on his writing included Charles Bukowski and Louis-Ferdinand Céline   In 2012 he served as the jury head for the 13th Melbourne Underground Film Festival and was instrumental for Donkey Love, a film about bestiality, being awarded Best Documentary.

On 3 August 2014 Justin Gene Gregorits was arrested for sexual battery and on 12 February 2016 convicted of Unlawful Sexual Activity with Certain Minors 16/17 yr old; F.S. 794.05(1).
He was received by the Florida Department of Corrections on 2/23/16 and has a tentative release date not before 4/13/24.

Bibliography

 Sex and Guts 4(2002)
 Midnight Mavericks: Reports From The Underground  (2007)
 HATCHET JOB: The Gene Gregorits Reader (2012)
 Dog Days: Volume One (2012)
 Dog Days: Volume Two (2013)
 Johnny Behind The Deuce (2013)
 Sex and Guts Anthology (2013)
 Dog Days Omnibus (2013)
 Fishook Volume One (2013)
 The Portland Eight Mile (2014)
 Do You Love Me: The Gene Gregorits File (2014)
 The Portable Gene Gregorits (2014)
 Terry Gilliam's Fear and Loathing in Las Vegas: The Untold Story (2014)
 Intra-Coastal: One Year On St Pete Beach (Volume One) (2014)
 Bigger Than Life at the Edge of the City (2017)

As a contributing writer

 Chelsea Hotel Manhattan: A Raw Eulogy To A New York Icon  (2008) 
 Antique Children: A Mischievous Literary Arts Journal (2010)
 Analysing David Peace (Katy Shaw, editor.  Cambridge Scholars Publishing) (2011)

Film work

 Born To Lose: The Last Rock'n'Roll Movie (Lech Kowalski, 1999) (graphic designer, promotion)
 Ronni Lee (Ron Athey, 2000) (lead actor)
 Blank Generation (Celine Dahnier, 2006) (actor)
 The Sand Trap (Casey Fischer, 2012) (subject)
 The Second Coming (Richard Wolstencroft, 2014) (lead actor)

In popular culture

In 2013, Gregorits gained some widespread notoriety after he cut part of his own ear off with a razor blade and ate the severed lobe, while filming the event.

References

External links
 official website
 Beat Magazine interview
 Vice Magazine interview
 Gene Gregorits interview with director Richard Stanley, from "Sex & Guts Vol. 3", 2001
 Up From the Underground: Sex & Guts Magazine Reborn
 Love and Pop interview
 Disqus profile
 The Alexxcast interview

1976 births
21st-century American memoirists
Living people
Novelists from Pennsylvania
21st-century American novelists
Postmodern writers
American male novelists
American male short story writers
21st-century American short story writers
21st-century American male writers
American male non-fiction writers